Lyudmyla and Nadiia Kichenok were the defending champions, but they chose to participate in Doha instead.

Antonia Lottner and Amra Sadiković won the title, defeating Tena Lukas and Bernarda Pera in the final, 5–7, 6–2, [10–5].

Seeds

Draw

References 
 Draw

ITF Women's Circuit UBS Thurgau - Doubles